José Pedro Gonçalves da Costa (born 9 April 1994) is a Portuguese footballer who plays as a goalkeeper for Alverca.

Football career
On 17 September 2014, Costa made his professional debut with Braga B in a 2014–15 Segunda Liga match against Académico Viseu.

On 28 June 2019 José Costa signed a 2-year contract with Liga II side FC Universitatea Cluj.

References

External links

Stats and profile at LPFP 

1994 births
Living people
People from Oliveira do Bairro
Portuguese footballers
Association football goalkeepers
Liga Portugal 2 players
Liga II players
S.C. Braga B players
Associação Académica de Coimbra – O.A.F. players
F.C. Penafiel players
FC Universitatea Cluj players
C.D. Cova da Piedade players
Portuguese expatriate footballers
Portuguese expatriate sportspeople in Romania
Expatriate footballers in Romania
Sportspeople from Aveiro District